Captain Clive Okoth (born circa 1982) is a Ugandan airline pilot, who serves as a captain at Uganda National Airlines Company, Uganda's national carrier airline, on the CRJ 900 aircraft, effective April 2019.

Background and education
Okoth was born in Uganda. After early education in Ugandan schools, he went on to train at the East African Civil Aviation Academy in Soroti, in the Eastern Region of Uganda. Later, he obtained further pilot training outside the country.

Career
Okoth's first job, out of flight school, was with the now defunct Air Uganda. When Air Uganda folded in 2014, he moved on to Arik Air Limited, based at Lagos International Airport, in Lagos State, Nigeria. In 2018, he was hired by the revived Uganda Airlines. He is one of the flight crew who piloted the two maiden aircraft from Mirabel, Quebec, Canada, to Entebbe, Uganda, in April 2019.

As of May 2019, Okoth had accumulated nearly 6,000 flight hours in the cockpit, with over 2,000 flight hours, in the cockpit of CRJ900 aircraft. As of December 2019, he had piloted the CRJ 200, the MD 87, the CRJ 900 and the CRJ 1000 aircraft. At that time, he was the youngest flight captain among the Uganda Airlines flight crew.

Family
Clive Okoth is a married father of three children as of December 2019.

See also
 Transport in Uganda
 Emma Mutebi
 Cornwell Muleya
 Michael Etyang

References

External links
 Website of Revived Uganda Airlines

Living people
1982 births
Ugandan aviators
Commercial aviators
People from Eastern Region, Uganda
East African Civil Aviation Academy alumni